Novobaykiyevo (Yañı Bäyki) is a rural locality (a village) in Michurinsky Selsoviet, Sharansky District, Bashkortostan, Russia. The population was 38 as of 2010. There is 1 street.

Geography 
Novobaykiyevo is located 28 km northeast of Sharan (the district's administrative centre) by road. Novobaygildino is the nearest rural locality.

References 

Rural localities in Sharansky District